Baron Charles Conrad Adolphus du Bois de Ferrieres (2 October 1823 – 17 March 1908) was Liberal Member of Parliament (MP) for Cheltenham, 1880 to 1885.

He was born in Tiel, The Netherlands, to a family  of Huguenot origin but his mother was English. He lived in England from infancy and spent 50 years in Cheltenham. He was naturalised in 1867 by an Act of Parliament and succeeded to his title as third  Baron de Ferrieres in the Dutch peerage in the same year. The title was created by William I of the Netherlands for his grandfather in 1820.

Baron de Ferrieres  was made Cheltenham's second Mayor in 1877 and was elected at the 1880 general election its Liberal MP, holding the seat until the  1885 general election .

He is best remembered for his gift to the town of the Art Gallery and paintings from his father's collection. He made gifts to various churches in the town and county, especially of stained-glass windows, to be found in Cheltenham Parish Church, Gloucester Cathedral, Cheltenham College Chapel and St Mary's, Chepstow. In recognition of his public munificence and private benefactions, as well as of his personal services to the community, he was made an honorary freeman of the borough in 1900.

He married in 1851 Anne Sheepshanks but had no children. His obituary stated that there was "scarcely a society or charitable institution in the town that [had] not benefited from his support". He is buried at St Peter's, Leckhampton, alongside his father where there are in all five stained-glass windows in his or his father's memory.

References

External links 
 

1823 births
1908 deaths
Liberal Party (UK) MPs for English constituencies
UK MPs 1880–1885
Barons of the Netherlands
People from Cheltenham
Councillors in Gloucestershire
Mayors of places in Gloucestershire
Politics of Cheltenham